Dadvan Ismat Yousuf Yousuf commonly known as Dadvan Yousuf (born April 9, 2000) is a Iraqi businessman of Kurdish origins. He made headlines in Switzerland as claimed the youngest self-made billionaire through bitcoin investments. 

As of 2023, he is currently under criminal investigations, primarily for money laundering and fraud activities by the Public persecutors office of the Canton of Bern. His Dornii Foundation is being investigated by the Swiss Financial Market Supervisory Authority (FINMA) for unauthorized activities, such as operating without a license. The mandated investigator is the renowned Swiss law firm Vischer AG.

Early life and education 
Yousuf was born in Zakho, Iraqi Kurdistan on April 9, 2000. His father was part of the Peshmerga and fled the country to Switzerland before Yousuf was born. Three years later his mother left the country as well, together with her three sons. They arrived in Neuenburg, Switzerland, in 2003 where his father had relocated. In 2004, the family was granted refugee and moved to Ipsach. Yousuf has five younger siblings which were born in Switzerland.

In 2017, he started an apprenticeship at the Eidgenössische Hochschulinstitut für Berufsbildung in Zollikofen. Around the same time, Yousuf claims to have developed a software for automated trades in cryptocurrencies, based on an algorithm analysing data and predicting fluctuations in the future.

Career 
Yousuf's career started from an early age. When he first heard about Bitcoin with 11 years old, Yousuf sold some of his toys in his neighborhood in Ipsach, Bern and used the money to invest in Bitcoin. He bought 10 Bitcoins for €15 each and has been trading in Bitcoin ever since. In 2012 he bought 1000 Bitcoins for €11,126 each. In 2016, he invested in Ethereum for the first time, buying 16 000 units for €134 000.

 According to Yousuf, the algorithm evaluates data stemming from technical analysis, social media, macroeconomics and public statements about cryptocurrencies. He founded the Dohrnii Foundation in Zug, which oversees the development of his cryptocurrency software. He also introduced his own cryptocurrency Dohrnii (DHN) in March 2021 as well as another token DHND in 2023. Yousuf became a multi-millionaire through his cryptocurrency trades. He is considered the youngest Swiss self-made millionaire.

In late 2021, Yousuf took over part of the Swiss startup Crowdlitoken and became their CEO subject to FMA. The startup was founded to develop solutions to allow people to invest in real estate through digital shares in the form of tokens.At the end of 2022, Yousuf published his own autobiography.

Controversy 
In February 2022, several critical press articles were published about Dadvan Yousuf and his ventures. For example, some information in his resume was embellished, which Yousuf again partly contradicts. Because of his crypto ventures, Yousuf is also currently in contact with the Swiss regulator FINMA. According to the company's own statements, the guidelines for the Initial coin offering were adhered to, but this cannot be proven; according to a crypto expert of the Swiss newspaper Blick, this may be possible under certain circumstances (as of March 2022). His foundation is currently being investigated on money laundry charges by FINMA and put under supervision of the law firm Vischer AG in Zürich.

In early 2023, it became public that Yousuf may have financial issues, due to the ongoing investigations of the Swiss Financial Market Supervisory Authority (FINMA). It was reported that he has several unpaid debts, such as hotel invoices in extent of 80,000 Swiss Francs (approximately $85k) for stays at the Dolder Grand in Zürich, Switzerland. Additionally there are outstanding collections of several service providers such as of a Rolls-Royce dealership, City Judge Office, Taxi companies. Yousuf argued that the FINMA blocked his accounts which resulted in payment difficulties for him.

Personal life 
Yousuf has his tax domicile in Ipsach near Bern. 

He was being entered in the commercial registry as a citizen of Ipsach (and therefore Swiss citizen) when he founded his foundation. However, this has in the meantime been corrected. Yousuf is a citizen of the Republic of Iraq and is believed to hold a Swiss residency permit type B or C.

References

Iraqi businesspeople
People associated with Bitcoin
2000 births
Living people